Sui Generis is the tenth album by Mexican pop singer Yuri. It was released on September 24, 1989. It sold more than 350,000 copies earning Gold and Platinum discs .

Track listing First Edition

Track listing Second Edition

Production
 Executive producer: Miguel Blasco
 Director: Loris Cerrone and Gian Pietro Felisatti
 Musical arrangements: Gian Pietro Felisatti, Santa-Noé and Loris Ceroni
 Sound engineer: Santa-Noé and Loris Cerrone
 Voice and mix engineer: John Pace and Gary Wagner
 Recording Studio: BABY ESTUDIO-Milán, CERRONE ESTUDIO-Gastel Bolognese, COMWAY ESTUDIO-Los Angeles, California
 Mixed in: BALU BALA Estudio-Madrid
 Art direction: Arturo Medellín
 Photography: Germán Herrera (Encamera)
 Graphic design: Karem Tretmanis
 Makeup: Eduardo Arias
 Fashion designer: Gabriela Diaque

Singles
 Embrujada (Estoy)
 Me Tienes Que Querer
 Mi Vecina
 Tienes el control de mi corazón

Single Charts

Before recording the album "Sui Generis"; She recorded a duet with Don Johnson to the track "A better place", that would project to the United States

Track listing 

1989 albums
Yuri (Mexican singer) albums
1989 EPs